Live Nation was a former American events promoter and venue operator based in Beverly Hills, California. Founded  in 1996 by Robert F. X. Sillerman as SFX Entertainment, the company's business was built around consolidating concert promoters into a national entity to counter the oversized influence of ticket behemoth Ticketmaster. In 2000, the company was sold to Clear Channel Communications for $4.4 billion and operated as Clear Channel Entertainment until 2005, when it was spun off as Live Nation. In 2010, Live Nation merged with the ticketing firm Ticketmaster to form a larger conglomerate named Live Nation Entertainment.

History

Early years 
The company was originally established in 1996 as SFX Entertainment, a subsidiary of media executive Robert F. X. Sillerman's SFX Broadcasting. During the late 1990s, SFX acquired a number of concert promoters, including Sunshine Promotions, The Entertainment Group, and Avalon Entertainment Partners. In 2000, Sillerman sold SFX to Clear Channel Communications for $4.4 billion. In 2005, Clear Channel spun off its entertainment division and named the new company Live Nation. Michael Rapino was appointed as the company's CEO.

2006 to 2009 
After spinning off from Clear Channel, Live Nation acquired companies in the music industry while selling off other lines of business. The company acquired the House of Blues chain in 2006. Live Nation also made several international acquisitions between 2006 and 2009, including Gamerco, a concert promoter based in Spain. In January 2008, Live Nation sold its North American theatrical business (including the Broadway Across America business) to Key Brand Entertainment for $90.4 million.  Also in September 2008, Feld Entertainment acquired its motorsports division.

Merger with Ticketmaster 
In February 2009, Live Nation announced that it had reached an agreement to merge with the ticket broker Ticketmaster in a $2.5 billion, all-stock deal.

The proposal initially received regulatory approval in Norway and Turkey. In October 2009, the United Kingdom's Competition Commission provisionally ruled against the merger with Ticketmaster. The Competition Commission later cleared the merger on December 22, 2009.

The United States Department of Justice approved the merger in 2010. A condition of the approval, Ticketmaster agreed to license its software to rival Anschutz Entertainment Group, and to sell its subsidiary Paciolan to Comcast Spectacor, Comcast's sporting events subsidiary. The company also agreed not to interfere with competition for the ten-year life of the agreement.

In response to the merger, music artist Bruce Springsteen wrote in a post on his website, "the one thing that would make the current ticket situation even worse for the fan than it is now would be Ticketmaster and Live Nation coming up with a single system, thereby returning us to a near monopoly situation in music ticketing." Additionally, Ticketdisaster.org, a coalition of consumer rights and anti-trust groups, released a statement opposing the merger.

2011 to present 
Live Nation made acquisitions following the merger with Ticketmaster. In 2011, it acquired the remaining 25% of Front Line Management Group Inc., an artist management firm that was majority owned by Ticketmaster. Also in 2011, Live Nation acquired online measurement company Big Champagne. In June 2013, Insomniac Events, a promoter focused on electronic dance music, announced a major "creative partnership" with Live Nation, giving the promoter access to Live Nation's resources while remaining an independent company. Live Nation did not take any ownership stake in Insomniac.

In December 2015, Live Nation launched Live Nation Productions, a film and television division. In 2018, Live Nation Productions produced A Star is Born, which starred Lady Gaga and Bradley Cooper.

Live Nation has acquired a stake in a number of festivals and festival management companies, including Voodoo Music & Arts Experience and Bonnaroo Music and Arts Festival. In 2016, Live Nation partnered with Jägermeister to sponsor six electronic dance music festivals. The company has also sponsored Music Midtown, a music festival based in Atlanta. In 2017, Live Nation acquired BottleRock Napa Valley music festival.

In late 2019, Live Nation announced "Lawn Pass", a one-time fee program for concertgoers to attend all 2020 events in the lawn section at 29 outdoor amphitheaters in the United States.

The company has agreed to match a $500,000 donation by singer Lizzo to Planned Parenthood in response to the Supreme Court decision to overturn Roe vs. Wade.

Controversies
According to a Houston Chronicle investigative report, Live Nation had been linked to at least 750 injuries and around 200 deaths at its events in seven countries since 2006.

The company has been under scrutiny by federal regulators for work safety and antitrust violations.

Artists and venues
Live Nation has an artist management division called Artist Nation. In October 2007, Live Nation reached a 10-year deal with Madonna, under which the company would collaborate on several facets of her career, including touring and merchandising.

In March 2008, it was confirmed that Live Nation signed a 12-year deal with U2 worth an estimated $100 million (£70 million).The parties agreed that the band would receive $25 million for 1.6 million shares of the company; as of 17 December 2008, those shares were worth only just over $6 million. It was reported on 18 December 2008 that Live Nation, honoring their financial commitment, bought back the shares at a loss of $19 million.

In July 2008, Shakira signed an estimated $70–100 million contract with Live Nation. The same year, Live Nation signed a 3-tour  deal with Canadian rock band, Nickelback. Also in 2008, a deal between Jay-Z and Live Nation for $152 million was confirmed. The deal covered financing of Jay-Z's own entertainment venture, live shows, tours and future recordings. Jay-Z signed a second 10-year deal with Live Nation in 2017.

Live Nation owns several venues and venue chains, including the House of Blues chain of clubs. The company also owns amphitheaters and operates several venues that it does not own.

International 
Live Nation owns and manages several international venues, including the Queen Elizabeth Olympic Park in London and 3Arena in Ireland. The company also owns a stake in several international artist and venue management firms, including Welldone Agency & Promotions in Finland, EMA Telstar Group in Sweden, Gunnar Eide Concerts in Norway, Mojo Concerts in the Netherlands, and Swedish EDM promoter Stureplansgruppen Live.

Between 2011 and 2013, Live Nation acquired companies in Dubai, Australia, New Zealand, and the UK. The company acquired several international festivals and festival management firms in 2016, including the Sweden Rock Festival, Australia's Secret Sounds Group, and Union Events, an Alberta-owned festival and concert promotion company. In 2017, Live Nation acquired a majority stake in Israeli promoter Bluestone Entertainment. Live Nation has owned a stake in several international festivals, including the Download Festival in Melbourne, Australia, the Rhythm and Vines Festival in New Zealand, and the Wireless Festival in London.

LN-Gaiety 
Live Nation has a 50/50 joint venture with Gaiety Investments, called LN-Gaiety. LN-Gaiety has made a number of acquisitions including the Academy Group and MAMA & Co. In March 2007 Live Nation/Gaiety bought a majority share in a further 10 music venues from the Academy Music Group including the Brixton Academy and Shepherds Bush Empire. The company also owns a majority stake in Festival Republic, a UK concert promoter, that organizes festivals such as the Reading and Leeds Festivals and Latitude.

See also

 Instant Live
 LiveStyle
 Monopoly

References
 Paul Sloan, Fortune Magazine, November 30, 2007. Accessed July 2008
 CCE Spinco, Inc. Common Stock Issue. At Us Government Archives. Accessed July 2008
 Live Nation Entertainment
 Seeking Alpha
 Variety
 Live Nation Takes Over
 History of SFX Entertainment

External links
 LiveNation.com

Live Nation Entertainment
Entertainment companies based in California
Record label distributors
Sports management companies
Companies based in Beverly Hills, California
Entertainment companies established in 1996
Entertainment companies established in 2005
2005 establishments in California
Corporate spin-offs